Olzhas Orazaliyev (Oljas Orazaliev; born January 2, 1980) is a Kazakhstani amateur boxer from Shymkent.

At the 2000 Summer Olympics, Orazaliyev defeated Argentina's Hugo Garay and Cuba's Isael Álvarez in the first two rounds, until he was lost to Sergey Mihaylov of Uzbekistan in the quarterfinal match.

References

1980 births
Living people
Light-heavyweight boxers
Boxers at the 2000 Summer Olympics
Olympic boxers of Kazakhstan
People from Shymkent
Boxers at the 2002 Asian Games
Kazakhstani male boxers
Asian Games competitors for Kazakhstan